Vera Alice Santos Zimmermann (born March 30, 1964 in São Paulo) is a Brazilian actress.

Daughter of a German father and a Gaucho mother, Vera began acting in the early 1980s, when she performed with Nelson Rodrigues the Eterno Retorno and Macunaíma, with Antunes Filho. She also inspired the song "Vera Gata" by Caetano Veloso.

In 2015 she was hired by RecordTV, to play Princess Henutmire in Os Dez Mandamentos. In 2017, she played the Queen Neusta, in O Rico e Lázaro.

Controversy 
In 2005, Vera caused controversy when appearing on the cover of Época magazine with the title "I had an Abortion". Such cover won the Esso prize of graphical creation for a magazine. The abortion was at age 25.

Filmography

Television

Films 
 1983 - Onda Nova
 1984 - A Estrela Nua
 1985 - Os Bons Tempos Voltaram: Vamos Gozar Outra Vez
 1990 - Atração Satânica
 1994 - O Efeito Ilha
 1997 - Mangueira - Amor à Primeira Vista
 1999 - Ela Perdoa
 1999 - Mário
 1999 - Amor que Fica
 2000 - Tônica Dominante
 2000 - Deus Jr.
 2002 - Joana e Marcelo, Amor (Quase) Perfeito
 2005 - Perdidos (short film)
 2007 - Páginas de Menina (short film)
 2016 - The Ten Commandments: The Movie
 2020 - A menina que matou os pais
 2020 - O menino que matou meus pais

References

External links 

1964 births
Living people
Actresses from São Paulo
Brazilian people of German descent
Brazilian telenovela actresses
Brazilian film actresses
Brazilian stage actresses